Kupoyarovo (Qupayar) is a rural locality (a village) in Alginsky Selsoviet, Davlekanovsky District, Bashkortostan, Russia. The population was 15 as of 2010. There are 2 streets.

Geography 
Kupoyarovo is located 34 km northwest of Davlekanovo (the district's administrative centre) by road. Alga is the nearest rural locality.

References 

Rural localities in Davlekanovsky District